Anticomp Folkilation is a 2-CD compilation album featuring a variety of artists from New York's anti-folk scene.

Sounds and Themes
This album itself has been described as incongruous yet in line with traditional Folk and Punk sensibilities.

Track listing

CD 1
 Major Matt Mason USA – Tripping Yourself
 Brook Pridemore – Sugar Coma (Snakes on My Brain)
 Soft Black – The Earth is Black
 The Wowz – You're Lovely
 Toby Goodshank – Black Eye
 A Brief View of the Hudson – She Will Never Speak
 Jeffrey Lewis and Diane Cluck – The River
 Jason Trachtenburg – Anyone Can Tell (In the Rain)
 Kimya Dawson – Will You Be Me
 Masheen Gun Kelly – Don't Bug Me I'm On My First Cup
 Lowry – Boone's Farm
 Elastic No-No Band – Sally's Strut
 ThREe DrinKs tO LizZie – splash'o'gin
 Beau Johnson – Gypsy
 The Real Urban Barnyard – Pooper Scooper
 Dan Penta – Joyless Now
 Lach – Baby
 Dan Costello – M&M's (I Love You More)

CD 2
 Eric Wolfson – Sleeping is a Sucker's Game
 Griffin and the True Believers – Beautiful Weather
 Ivan Sandomire – Drunk Faeries
 Matt Singer – VHS
 Erin Regan – Your Mom's Car
 Paleface – I Don't Think I Like You (As Much As I Used To)
 David LK Murphy – Peace of Mind
 Dead Blonde Girlfriend – Velvet Coffin
 The Festival – The Ink Festival
 Ben Godwin – Terminus
 The Sewing Circle – Sewer Gators NYC
 Creaky Boards – I'm So Serious This Time
 The Bowmans – The Slumber
 Dan Fishback – Faggotssaywhat?
 Frank Hoier – I Can't Love You Anymore
 Debe Dalton – Ed's Song
 Urban Barnyard – Johnny's Kitchen

References

External links
Crafty Records Anticomp page

Anti-folk albums
2007 compilation albums